Mathis is a surname and a given name. It may also refer to:

Mathis, Missouri, an unincorporated community
Mathis, Texas, United States, a city
Mathis Independent School District, a public school district
Mathis Spur, Queen Elizabeth Land, Antarctica
Mathis Nunataks, Marie Byrd Land, Antarctica
Mathis Airport, Georgia, United States, a private airport
Mathis (cars), a firm in Alsace which produced cars between 1910 and 1950